Diego Alonso Estrada Valverde (born 25 May 1989 in Alajuela,  Costa Rica) is a Costa Rican footballer who plays for Guadalupe.

Club career
Estrada began his professional career at Costa Rican club Alajuelense. His good performances with Costa Rican U-20 team lead to transfer interest from Benfica and Sporting Lisbon.

On 31 December 2010, Adelaide United announced that they had agreed to terms with Estrada on a 3-year contract, which did not eventuate in the January 2011 transfer window. He then went to Spain to play for Zaragoza in 2011, but only in May 2014 FIFA condemned the Spanish club to pay Alajuelense 486,000 euros for Estrada.

He played for Comunicaciones from Guatemala during 2012 and has signed a one-year contract to play for Deportivo Saprissa from Costa Rica starting 2013.

International career
Estrada played for Costa Rica at U-20 level and was a key player in their CONCACAF Under-20 Championship title win in 2009 where he also scored in the final in a 3-0 demolishing of the United States U-20 team. Estrada then went on to become yet again the key player in his side's campaign at the FIFA U-20 World Cup where they narrowly lost to Brazil national football team in the semi finals.

He made his senior debut for Costa Rica in a January 2010 friendly match against Argentina and has, as of May 2014, earned a total of 4 caps, scoring no goals.

Career statistics
(Current as of 2 January 2011)

References

External links

1989 births
Living people
People from Alajuela
Association football midfielders
Costa Rican men's footballers
Costa Rican expatriate footballers
Costa Rica international footballers
L.D. Alajuelense footballers
Deportivo Saprissa players
Comunicaciones F.C. players
Real Zaragoza B players
FBC Melgar footballers
C.S. Herediano footballers
Municipal Grecia players
C.S. Cartaginés players
Guadalupe F.C. players
Liga FPD players
Segunda División B players
Liga Nacional de Fútbol de Guatemala players
Peruvian Primera División players
Costa Rican expatriate sportspeople in Guatemala
Costa Rican expatriate sportspeople in Spain
Expatriate footballers in Guatemala
Expatriate footballers in Spain
Expatriate footballers in Peru
2009 CONCACAF U-20 Championship players